Hana Meisel (born 25 December 1883, died 1972) was a Jewish agronomist, feminist and Zionist.

Life

Meisel was born in Grodno in the Russian Empire (today Hrodna in Belarus), and immigrated to Palestine in 1909, during the Second Aliyah, where she became a noted agronomist. Meisel was a founder of Havat HaAlamot ("the maidens' farm") agricultural school at Kinneret Farm in 1911 (closed in 1917), and of the agricultural school for girls at Nahalal (opened in 1929). She studied agriculture and natural science in Odessa, Switzerland and France.

Meisel made considerable contributions to the feminist wing of the Zionist movement. She was a member of Poale Zion and was elected to the Assembly of Representatives.

She was married to Eliezer Shohat, also a well-known figure in the Zionist movement, much like his brother Israel Shochat.

Hana Meisel died at Nahalal in 1972.

In literature
Meisel is referenced in Shmuel Yosef Agnon's fictionalized travelogue of the Second Aliyah HaGalilah (in English as "To the Galilee"), published in his posthumous volume Pithei Devarim.

References

External links
Esther Carmel-Hakim. "Hannah Maisel-Shohat". Jewish Women: A Comprehensive Historical Encyclopedia. 1 March 2009. Jewish Women's Archive. (Viewed on January 9, 2016) 

1890 births
1972 deaths
People from Grodno
Belarusian Jews
Jews in Ottoman Palestine
Jews in Mandatory Palestine
Israeli people of Belarusian-Jewish descent
Jewish scientists
Israeli feminists
Israeli educators
Israeli women educators
Israeli Jews
Jewish feminists
Members of the Assembly of Representatives (Mandatory Palestine)
20th-century Israeli women politicians
Women agronomists
20th-century women scientists
Zionists
Jewish women scientists
20th-century agronomists